Poospizopsis is a genus of  warbler-like tanagers. They are found in highland forest in South America.

Taxonomy and species list
A molecular phylogenetic study of the tanager family Thraupidae published in 2014 found that the genus Poospiza was  polyphyletic. In the subsequent reorganization two species from Poospiza were assigned to the resurrected genus Poospizopsis that had been introduced in 1893 by the German ornithologist Hans von Berlepsch with the chestnut-breasted mountain finch as the type species. The name of the genus combines Poospiza with the Ancient Greek opsis meaning "appearance".

The two species now placed in the genus are:

References

 
Bird genera
Taxa named by Hans von Berlepsch